Rusted Rail is an Irish independent record label that was started in 2006 by Keith Wallace.

Rusted Rail have released albums by artists including Phantom Dog Beneath the Moon, United Bible Studies, The Declining Winter. Music for Dead Birds and Songs of Green Pheasant amongst other artists from Ireland, The UK and Europe.

History
Keith Wallace formed the label after working as station manager for Flirt FM. They release records primarily on 3" CD, but also on standard format CD. The records released by the label have received international attention for their handmade aesthetic and experimental content. CUBS is a group comprising artists who have released material through the label, including Phantom Dog Beneath The Moon, Loner Deluxe, A Lilac Decline, United Bible Studies, and The Driftwood Manor.

Artists

A Lilac Decline
Phantom Dog Beneath the Moon
CUBS
Directorsound
Good Sheppard
So Cow
The Dovetail Consort
The Driftwoof Manor
The Declining Winter
Yawning Chasm
Half Forward Line 
Loner Deluxe 
Phosphene
Songs of Green Pheasant
Music for Dead Birds
United Bible Studies
Songs of Green Pheasant 
Brigid Mae Power
Agitated Radio pilot 
CWK Joynes
Plinth
Mirakil Whip

References

External links

Irish record labels
Record labels established in 2006